Eben Venter is an Afrikaans-speaking writer who was born in Burgersdorp in South Africa and has lived in Australia, Japan and the Netherlands. He published eleven works of fiction (novels, short story collections and a cookbook). His works have been translated into English, Dutch and German.

He was awarded the M-Net Literary Award in 2010 for his book Santa Gamka.

Life
Venter was raised on a farm in Eastern Cape. He went to Grey College in Bloemfontein before he was conscripted into the air force and served on the Angolan border. He obtained an MA in philosophy and worked as a journalist in Johannesburg before leaving South Africa in 1986, during the State of Emergency. He went to Australia where he worked as a chef in his sibling's café.

In 2005, Venter taught at Adam Mickiewicz University and Palacky University before becoming a writer-in-residency at the Netherlands Institute for Advanced Study in 2007.

On August 4, 2010, Venter was nominated for the M-Net Literary Award in the Afrikaans category for his book Santa Gamka.

The Nelson Mandela Metropolitan University awarded him as an alumni achiever in November 2011. In 2012, he was writer-in-residence at Rhodes University. In 2018, Venter released his first book created in English instead of Afrikaans titled Green as the Sky Is Blue.

List of titles
1986 Witblitz
1993 Foxtrot van die vleiseters, translated into German (as Burenfoxtrott) and Dutch (Dans aan het einde van de dag)
1996 Ek stamel, ek sterwe, translated into English (My Beautiful Death) and Dutch (Ik stamel ik sterf)
1999 My simpatie, Cerise
2000 Twaalf
2003 Begeerte
2006 Horrelpoot, translated as Trencherman
2009 Santa Gamka
2010 Brouhaha
2013 Wolf, Wolf, translated into English by Michiel Heyns

Awards
 1994 Media24 Books Literary Awards (WA Hofmeyr Prize) – Foxtrot van die vleiseters
 1996 Media24 Books Literary Awards (WA Hofmeyr Prize) – Ek stamel, ek sterwe
 2004 Media24 Books Literary Awards (WA Hofmeyr Prize) – Begeerte
 2010 Media24 Books Literary Awards (WA Hofmeyr Prize) – Santa Gamka
 2010 M-Net Literary Awards – Santa Gamka

References

External links
 Author focus of publisher Tafelberg
 Interview with Eben Venter

1954 births
Living people
South African writers
Nelson Mandela University alumni